That Says It All may refer to:

"That Says It All", a track on 1998 Duncan Sheik album  Humming 
That Says It All, 1992 album by Jean Stafford